Niels Brock (19 March 1731 – 4 October 1802) was a Danish merchant. He funded the establishment of the first business school in Copenhagen, which is now named Niels Brock Copenhagen Business College after him. The Niels Brock House, his former home on Strandgade in Copenhagen, is a listed building.

Career
Niels Brock was born to a merchant father in Randers in 1731. After a two-year stay at a merchant school in Lübeck, he was employed in his uncle's office in Copenhagen. Prompted by his father's death in 1754, he went back to Randers to settle his father's affairs but returned to Copenhagen in 1756 where he established a successful business with trade in linen and groceries. He traded within Denmark–Norway and with the Russian Empire (what today is Poland, Russia, Estonia, Latvia and Lithuania). He was also active as a broker and in insurance.

Niels Brock was appointed to the Council of 32 Men by the king.

Personal life
In 1762, Niels Brock married Lene Bredahl, daughter of Randers mayor Nicolai Krag Bredahl. Lene Brock died in 1786 and the couple had no children. He constructed the Niels Brock House at 36 Strandgade in the Christianshavn neighbourhood of Copenhagen in 1780 and lived there until his death in 1802.

Legacy

At the event of his death in 1802, Niels Brock left an estate of 865,000  which was used for grants in Randers and Copenhagen.  also received a sum for the establishment of a merchant school. This was done under the auspices of the Association for the Education of Young Merchants in 1881 under the name . Carl Frederik Tietgen, who was a member of the board of the foundation that administrated Brock's heritage, founded an advanced school of merchantry under the name  in 1888. The two schools were merged under the name  in 1908. In 1991, it changed its name to Niels Brock Copenhagen Business College.

References

18th-century Danish businesspeople
18th-century merchants
Danish businesspeople in shipping
Danish merchants
People from Randers
Businesspeople from Copenhagen
1731 births
1802 deaths